Joseph Bennet Hachey (March 3, 1877 – March 22, 1953), also known as Benoit Hachey, was a Canadian politician. He served in the Legislative Assembly of New Brunswick from 1912 to 1917 as an independent member. He died in 1953.

References 

1877 births
1953 deaths